World Music is a compilation album by American blues artist Taj Mahal.

Track listing
All tracks composed by Taj Mahal; except where indicated
 "When I Feel the Sea Beneath My Soul" - 3:06 - from Music Keeps Me Together (1975)
 "My Ancestors" - 4:05 - from Music Keeps Me Together (1975)
 "Slave Driver" (Bob Marley) - 2:43 - from Mo' Roots (1974)
 "West Indian Revelation" - 6:58 - from Music Keeps Me Together (1975)
 "Kalimba" - 1:39 - from Recycling The Blues & Other Related Stuff (1972)
 "Desperate Lover" - 2:44 - from Mo' Roots (1974)
 "Clara (St. Kitts Woman)" - 4:02 - from Mo' Roots (1974)
 "Cajun Waltz" - 6:03 - from Mo' Roots (1974)
 "Roll, Turn, Spin" - 4:45 - from Music Keeps Me Together (1975)
 "Johnny Too Bad" (The Slickers) - 3:15 - from Mo' Roots (1974)
 "Brown Eyed Handsome Man" - 3:43 - from Music Keeps Me Together (1975)
 "Blackjack Davey" - 3:37 - from Mo' Roots (1974)
 "Music Keeps Me Together" (Earl Lindo) - 3:38 - from Music Keeps Me Together (1975)
 "When I Feel the Sea Beneath My Soul (Reprise)" - 3:06

References

Taj Mahal (musician) compilation albums
1993 albums
Columbia Records albums